Hortsavinyà is a village within the municipality of Tordera in the comarca of Maresme, province of Barcelona, Catalonia, Spain.

The GR 92 long distance footpath, which roughly follows the length of the Mediterranean coast of Spain, has a staging point at Hortsavinyà.

References 

Populated places in Maresme